47Ter (pronounced Quarante-sept Terre) is a French hip hop band from western Paris. The trio is composed of Pierre-Paul, Blaise and Lopes, all of whom come from Bailly.

Before forming 47Ter, Pierre-Paul and Lopes were members of a rock group known as Fresh Octopus, now defunct. After posting their videos on YouTube between 2017 and 2018, including remakes of songs such as On vient gâcher tes classiques, the trio released their debut EP (extended play) entitled Petits Princes in 2018. They followed this up with the release of an 11-track freestyle recording offered online. On 18 February 2018, the group had their first live invite on the radio for new talents called "On en parle.." on Radio Sensations.

In 2019, 47Ter released their studio album titled L'adresse, an album with mixed rap and pop music. The trio was scheduled to perform at Las Cigale, Olympia and at the Solidays Festival, but all were cancelled because of the COVID-19 pandemic.

The group released their second album titled Légende on 16 April 2021 and are currently preparing for their debut concert tour titled the Légende Tour, which is set to begin on the 12th of February 2022 in Amneville, and will make stops in cities around France and Europe.

Discography

Albums

EPs and other releases

Singles

Other songs

References

French musical groups